Southwest Valley High School is rural, public high school located in Corning, Iowa, United States. The school was renamed after Corning Community Schools and Villisca Community Schools entered into a whole-grade sharing agreement. Under the terms of the agreement, Corning is responsible for the education of grades 9-12 and administration of all high school athletics. Villisca is home to the Southwest Valley Middle School and is responsible for the education of grades 6-8 and administration of all junior high athletics. The new moniker for the combined schools is Southwest Valley Timberwolves.

The Corning district serves Corning and Carbon, while the Villisca district serves Villisca and Nodaway.

Predecessor schools
Corning High School was a public secondary school in Corning Iowa, United States. The school served more than 150 students in grades 9 through 12 as the only public high school in Adams County and is administered by Corning Community Schools. The school's former mascot and athletic emblem was the Red Raiders.

Villisca High School was a public secondary school in Villisca, Iowa, United States. The school served more than 100 students in grades 9 through 12 and was one of three high schools in Montgomery County, administered by Villisca Community Schools.  The school's former mascot and athletic emblem was the Bluejays.

Athletics 
The Timberwolves compete in the Pride of Iowa Conference in the following sports:

 Football
 Volleyball
 Cross Country
 Basketball
 Wrestling
 Bowling
 Golf
 Tennis
 Track and Field
 Baseball
 Softball

References

External links

See also
List of school districts in Iowa
List of high schools in Iowa

Education in Adams County, Iowa
Public high schools in Iowa